Vishnutherium (Vishnu's beast) is an extinct genus of the Giraffidae. It was first named by Lydekker in 1876. Its fossils have been found in India.

External links
 Vishnutherium at the Paleobiology Database

Prehistoric giraffes
Prehistoric even-toed ungulate genera